Futebol Clube de Marinhas (abbreviated as FC Marinhas) is a Portuguese football club based in Marinhas, Esposende in the district of Braga.

Background
FC Marinhas currently plays in the Terceira Divisão Série A which is the fourth tier of Portuguese football. The club was founded in 1967 and they play their home matches at the Complexo Desportivo de Marinhas in Marinhas, Esposende. The stadium is able to accommodate 3,500 spectators.

The club is affiliated to Associação de Futebol de Braga and has competed in the AF Braga Taça. The club has also entered the national cup competition known as Taça de Portugal on occasions.

Season to season

Honours

AF Braga Honra A: 2001/2002 and 2005/06

Footnotes

External links
Official website 

Football clubs in Portugal
Association football clubs established in 1967
1967 establishments in Portugal
Esposende